Silver Deputy (February 25, 1985, in Ontario – October 4, 2014) was a Canadian Thoroughbred racehorse best known as a top sire in North America. He was a son of Deputy Minister, who was an Eclipse and Sovereign Award winning runner and the 1997/98 Leading sire in North America. His dam was Silver Valley, a daughter of Mr. Prospector, the 1987/88 Leading sire in North America and nine-time Leading broodmare sire in North America.

Silver Deputy was purchased for $200,000 by Windfields Farm of Oshawa, Ontario at the  Fasig-Tipton July 1986 select yearling auction in Kentucky. After he won the Grade III Swynford Stakes at Woodbine Racetrack, an injury ended his racing career and he began stallion duty in 1989. He initially stood at stud Windfields Farm in Canada, but his immediate success led to demand from United States breeders and he was sent to stand at Brookdale Farm near Versailles, Kentucky, where he became one of the most consistent stallions in the state.

Stud record
A sire of more than 75 stakes winners, Silver Deputy produced Hall of Fame inductee Silverbulletday. His other top runners include:
 Archers Bay, 1998 Canadian Champion Three-Year-Old Male Horse, won Queen's Plate, Prince of Wales Stakes
 Atago Taisho, millionaire multiple stakes winner in Japan
 Badge of Silver, millionaire multiple stakes winner in the United States
 Bare Necessities, millionaire multiple stakes winner in the United States
 Crown Attorney, multiple stakes winner in Canada. Career earnings of US$993,959
 Deputy Jane West, Canadian Champion Two-Year-Old Filly & Canadian Champion Three-Year-Old Filly
 Larkwhistle, Canadian Champion Two-Year-Old Filly
 Divine Silver, multi-millionaire multiple stakes winner in Japan
 Mr. Jester, multiple stakes winner in the United States. Career earnings of US$785,400
 Poetically, Canadian Champion Two-Year-Old Filly
 Pool Land, stakes wins include G1 Ruffian Handicap
 Pool Play, stakes wins include G1 Stephen Foster Handicap
 Posse, multiple stakes winner in the United States. Career earnings of US$662,841
 Al's Deputy, multiple stakes winner gelding in the United States, including winning George W. Barker Handicap (Black Type)[winner of US$218,025
 Scotzanna, Canadian Champion Three-Year-Old Filly & Canadian Champion Sprint Horse
 Silver Ticket, multiple stakes winner in Canada. Career earnings of US$549,170
 Silverbulletday, American Champion Two-Year-Old Filly & American Champion Three-Year-Old Filly, National Museum of Racing and Hall of Fame 
 
Silver Deputy was pensioned in September 2008.

Pedigree

References

1985 racehorse births
2014 racehorse deaths
Racehorses bred in Canada
Racehorses trained in Canada
Thoroughbred family 2-s